The 2017 South American Under-17 Football Championship was the 17th edition of the South American Under-17 Football Championship, a football competition for the under-17 national teams in South America organized by CONMEBOL. It was held in Chile from 23 February to 19 March 2017.

Brazil were crowned champions, and together with Chile, Paraguay and Colombia, which were the top four teams of this tournament, qualified for the 2017 FIFA U-17 World Cup in India.

Teams
All ten CONMEBOL member national teams entered the tournament.

Venues

According to ANFP sources, Chile was named as host country of the tournament during the CONMEBOL Executive Committee meeting held on 12 May 2015, this was ratified by CONMEBOL at another meeting of its Executive Committee held on 4 April 2016. The chosen venues were Estadio El Teniente, Rancagua (Group A and final stage) and Estadio Fiscal, Talca (Group B). On 22 February 2017, Estadio La Granja, Curicó was added as an emergency venue to host the first two matchdays of Group B since Estadio Fiscal field was in poor condition.

Squads

Each team registered a squad of 23 players (three of whom must be goalkeepers).

Draw
The draw of the tournament was held on 12 January 2017, 14:00 CLST (UTC−3), at the Chilean Football Federation headquarters in Santiago, Chile. The ten teams were drawn into two groups of five. The hosts Chile and the defending champions Brazil were seeded into Group A and Group B respectively and assigned to position 1 in their group, while the remaining eight teams were placed into four "pairing pots" according to their final positions in the 2015 South American Under-17 Football Championship (shown in brackets).

Match officials
The referees and assistants referees were:

 Jorge Baliño and Fernando Rapallini
Assistants: Lucas Germanotta and Gabriel Chade
 Juan Nelio García
Assistants: Jorge Baldivieso and Roger Orellana
 Raphael Claus
Assistants: Bruno Pires and Danilo Manis
 Eduardo Gamboa
Assistants: Claudio Ríos and Edson Cisternas
 Luis Sánchez
Assistants: Wilmar Navarro and Dionisio Ruiz

 Juan Albarracín
Assistants: Ricardo Barén and Edwin Bravo
 José Méndez
Assistants: Juan Zorrilla and Carlos Cáceres
 Michael Espinoza
Assistants: Michael Orué and Stephen Atoche
 Leodán González and Óscar Rojas
Assistants: Miguel Nievas and Gabriel Popovits
 Adrián Cabello
Assistants: Tulio Moreno and Elbis Gómez

The Uruguayan referee Esteban Ostojich was replaced by Leodán González after Ostojich was ruled out of the championship after suffering an injury. González was assisted by Wilmar Navarro and Dionisio Ruiz (Colombia) in the first stage and by Nievas and Popovits (Uruguay) in the final stage.
For the final stage, Fernando Rapallini (Argentina), Óscar Rojas and the assistants Miguel Nievas and Gabriel Popovits (Uruguay) were included.
The Colombian referee Luis Sánchez, Ostojich and the uruguayan assistants Carlos Pastorino and Horacio Ferreiro did not referee any match in the tournament.

First stage
The top three teams in each group advanced to the final stage.

Tiebreakers
When teams finished level of points, the final rankings were determined according to:
 goal difference
 goals scored
 head-to-head result between tied teams (two teams only)
 drawing of lots

All times local, CLST (UTC−3).

Group A

Group B

Final stage
When teams finished level of points, the final rankings were determined according to the same criteria as the first stage, taking into account only matches in the final stage.

Winners

Goalscorers
7 goals

 Vinícius Jr.

5 goals

 Lincoln

4 goals

 Martín Sánchez

3 goals

 Alan
 Santiago Barrero
 Jaminton Campaz
 Juan Peñaloza
 Roberto Fernández
 Fernando Romero
 Jan Carlos Hurtado

2 goals

 Facundo Colidio
 Ferddy Roca
 Paulinho
 Yuri Alberto
 Gastón Zuñiga
 Santiago Micolta
 Jordan Rezabala
 Alan Rodríguez
 José Barragán

1 goal

 Agustín Obando
 Sebastián Melgar
 Alerrandro
 Brenner
 Lucas Halter
 Marcos Antônio
 Lucas Alarcón
 Antonio Díaz
 Alexis Valencia
 Sebastián Valencia
 Luis Miguel López
 Juan David Martínez
 Juan David Vidal
 Jhon Campos
 Jackson Porozo
 Mauricio Quiñónez
 Cristian Tobar
 Antonio Galeano
 Nicolás Morínigo
 Jesús Rolón
 Leonardo Mifflin
 Gonzalo Sánchez
 Thomás Chacón
 Owen Falconis
 José Neris
 Gustavo Daniel Viera
 Cristian Cásseres
 Sebastián Chalbaud
 Jorge Echeverría
 Eduardo Fereira
 Diego Luna
 Christian Makoun

Own goal
 Jackson Porozo (playing against Chile)
 Anthony Fuentes (playing against Paraguay)
 Diego Luna (playing against Brazil)

Qualified teams for FIFA U-17 World Cup
The following four teams from CONMEBOL qualified for the 2017 FIFA U-17 World Cup.

1 Bold indicates champion for that year. Italic indicates host for that year.

References

External links
Sudamericano Masculino Sub 17 Chile 2017 

2017
2017 South American Under-17 Championship
2017 in South American football
2016–17 in Chilean football
2017 in youth association football
March 2017 sports events in South America